is a Japanese dish made with chilled tofu and toppings.

Variety of toppings 

The choice of toppings on the tofu vary among households and restaurants, but a standard combination is chopped green onion with katsuobushi (dried skipjack tuna flakes) and soy sauce. Other toppings include:
 perilla leaf
 yuzu rind
 daikon radish
 sliced myoga ginger
 grated ginger
 sliced okra
 plum paste
 mustard

History and background 

Hiyayakko is also known as hiyakko or yakko-dōfu. Hiya means cold, and yakko refers to the servants of samurai during the Edo period in Japan. They wore a vest on which the "nail-puller crest" was attached, on the shoulders; therefore, cutting something (e.g. tofu) into cubes was called . "Hiyakkoi" or "hyakkoi", the Tokyo dialectal term equivalent to the standard Japanese , is also a possible etymology.

In the Tofu Hyakuchin, it is said that hiyayakko is so well known that it needs no introduction.

In haiku, hiyayakko is a season word for summer.  This is because tofu is often enjoyed cold in the summer, warm and boiled in a broth in the winter.

See also 
 Japanese cuisine
 List of tofu dishes

References

External links 
 Hiyayakko – Japanese Basic Recipes Bob & Angie

Japanese cuisine
Tofu dishes
Japanese cuisine terms